Noah Harlan is an independent film producer and Founder of Two Bulls.  He produced six feature films, three with director Raphael Nadjari. Noah received an Emmy Award in "Advanced Media Interactivity" in 2008.

Harlan grew up in Cranbury, New Jersey. graduated from Williams College in 1997 with a degree in Computer Science.  He also studied at Trinity College (University of Melbourne) and the British American Drama Academy.

He lives in Manhattan with his wife, author Micol Ostow.

References

External links

Living people
Film producers from New Jersey
Alumni of the British American Drama Academy
People from Cranbury, New Jersey
Williams College alumni
Year of birth missing (living people)